Cătălin Andrei Ion (born 13 November 1998) is a Romanian professional footballer who plays as a defender.

References

External links
 

1998 births
Living people
People from Caracal, Romania
Romanian footballers
Association football defenders
CS Universitatea Craiova players
Liga I players
Liga II players
Liga III players
FC Astra Giurgiu players
CSM Reșița players
LPS HD Clinceni players